Michigan's 5th Senate district is one of 38 districts in the Michigan Senate. It has been represented by Democrat Dayna Polehanki since 2023, following her primary defeat of fellow Democrat Betty Jean Alexander.

Geography
District 5 encompasses part of Wayne County.

2011 Apportionment Plan
District 5, as dictated by the 2011 Apportionment Plan, was based in central Wayne County, covering parts of western Detroit as well as the surrounding communities of Dearborn Heights, Garden City, Inkster, and Redford.

The district was largely located within Michigan's 13th congressional district, also extending into the 12th and 14th districts. It overlapped with the 7th, 8th, 9th, 10th, 11th, and 13th districts of the Michigan House of Representatives.

Recent election results

2018

2014

Federal and statewide results in District 5

Historical district boundaries

References 

5
Wayne County, Michigan